Surveillance and target acquisition (STA) is a military role assigned to units and/or their equipment. It involves watching an area to see what changes (surveillance) and then the acquisition of targets based on that information.

Artillery STA
The role of STA artillery is to locate, track, assess and where appropriate cue the attack of hostile artillery, mortars, units and formation.  

It provides commanders with surveillance and targeting information across the battle space and is always linked by a robust command-and-control (C2) system to offensive support (OS) systems.

Units

British Army

Regular army
4/73 (Sphinx) Special Observation Post Battery RA
5th Regiment Royal Artillery

Army Reserve
Honourable Artillery Company 
204 (Tyneside Scottish) Battery Royal Artillery
269 (West Riding) Battery Royal Artillery

French Army
61e régiment d'artillerie

German Army
Artillerieaufklärungsbataillon 131, Mühlhausen

Australian Army
20th Regiment, Royal Australian Artillery

Italian Army
01.09.2004 - today
 Com.F.O.Ter. Comando delle Forze Operative Terrestri (Verona)
 Co.T.I.E. Comando Trasmissioni ed Informazioni dell'Esercito (Anzio - Caserma “Santa Barbara”)
 Brg.R.I.S.T.A.-I.E.W. Brigata Reconnaissance, Intelligence, Surveillance, Target Acquisition – Intelligence and Electronic Warfare (Anzio - Caserma “Santa Barbara”)
 41° Rgt.A.Ter.Sor.A.O. Reggimento Artiglieria Terrestre Sorveglianza ed Aquisizione Obiettivi (Casarsa della Delizia - Caserma “Trieste”)
 2° Gr.Sor.A.O. Gruppo Sorveglianza ed Aquisizione Obiettivi (Sora - Caserma “Simone Simoni”)
 B.A.T. Batteria Aerei Teleguidati

 Com.F.O.Ter. Comando delle Forze Operative Terrestri (Verona)
 Com.F.O.S.E. Comando delle Forze Speciali dell'Esercito
 185° Reggimento Paracadutisti Ricognizione Acquisizione Obiettivi "Folgore"

United States Marine Corps
Target Acquisition Platoon (TAP)

Equipment
Counter-battery radar (CoBRa)
Mobile Artillery Monitoring Battlefield Asset (MAMBA)
Advanced Sound-ranging Programme (ASP)
Unmanned aerial vehicles (UAVs)

See also
 C4ISTAR
 RSTA (U.S. Army)
 CARVER matrix

Targeting (warfare)
Artillery operation
Military intelligence collection